Americium(II) chloride, also known as dichloroamericium, is the chemical compound composed of americium and chloride with the formula AmCl2.

References

Americium compounds
Chlorides
Actinide halides